Ilinci is a village in Serbia. It is situated in the Šid municipality, in the Srem District, Vojvodina province. The village has a Serb ethnic majority and its population numbering 827 people (2002 census).

Name

Formerly, it was known as Sveti Ilija (Свети Илија). The name of the village in Serbian is plural.

Historical population

1961: 1,456
1971: 1,198
1981: 1,011
1991: 883
2002: 827

References
Slobodan Ćurčić, Broj stanovnika Vojvodine, Novi Sad, 1996.

See also
List of places in Serbia
List of cities, towns and villages in Vojvodina

Populated places in Syrmia